Epsilon (Ε, ε) is the fifth letter of the Greek alphabet.

Epsilon may also refer to:

Aviation
Advance Epsilon, a Swiss paraglider design
Socata TB 30 Epsilon, a French training aircraft design

Media 
 Epsilon (Blood Stain Child album)
 Epsilon (Dreamtale album)
 Epsilon (film) (also titled Alien Visitor) (1995) AustralianItalian science fiction film by Rolf de Heer
 Epsilon, an AI fragment in Red vs. Blue
 E Channel (Greece) or simply Epsilon is a TV channel in Greece
 Epsilon TV is a Greek regional television channel
 Epsilon, the lowest caste of the World State in Brave New World
 Epsilon, an antagonist in the video game Mega Man X: Command Mission

Mathematics
 Error in the numerical computing:
 Machine epsilon, an error bound in computer arithmetic
 absolute value of an approximation error
 The epsilon operator introduced by Hilbert

Technology 
 EPSILON (programming language)
 Epsilon (text editor)
 Epsilon (rocket), a Japanese solid-fuel satellite launcher
 GM Epsilon platform, an automobile platform
 Hyundai Epsilon engine

Other 
 Epsilon (wasp), a genus of wasps
 Hurricane Epsilon (2005)
 Hurricane Epsilon (2020)
 Lancia Epsilon, a car produced by Lancia
 MS Epsilon, a ROPAX ferry
 A subsidiary of marketing company Alliance Data
 SARS-CoV-2 Epsilon variant, a variant of SARS-CoV-2, the virus that causes COVID-19

See also
 Latin epsilon (Ԑ, ԑ), a letter of the Latin alphabet
 Reversed Ze (Ԑ, ԑ), a letter of the Cyrillic alphabet